Vodnik ( [Automotive number GAZ-3937 and its modified version GAZ-39371]) is a Russian high-mobility multipurpose military vehicle manufactured by GAZ.  It is a "heavy modification" of the civil GAZ-2330 "Tigr".  Its name comes from the Russian "водник" – a person employed in water transport, but is also used to refer to some person or object simply related to water.

The Vodnik was adopted by the Russian Armed Forces.

Description
This vehicle is amphibious, and uses its wheels to propel itself when afloat.  It has a water-displacing hermetic hull which provides improved fording performance and a 4x4-type chassis with independent suspension and a centralized system of tire-pressure control.  The ground clearance is 475 mm. The standard undercarriage with a cab can be fitted with a number of different modules with various number of passenger seats and cargo compartments, seating up to 10 people.  It is powered by a 175 hp (130 kW) diesel engine giving a top speed of 112 km/h (4 to 5 km/h when swimming).

The car is built on a modular scheme.  Welded body includes two removable modules.  Front module consists of a power department and management, divided sealed bulkhead.

The rear multi-module due to the quick release coupling can be replaced in the field.  In other words, a single chassis can perform several functions, depending on the installed modules:

 transportation of people;
 freight handling and processing equipment in remote areas;
 transportation of residential units and other utilities modules;
 perform the functions of technological machines fuel and energy complex (tankers, containers, etc.).

The vehicle has a switchable front wheel drive, independent torsion bar suspension, central tire inflation system, power steering and a powerful system for heating and air conditioning.

Armament
The Vodnik may be fitted with the same BPU-1 turret, designed in late 1970s, as the BTR-80 on the top of the vehicle towards the rear. The turret is fitted with the 14.5 mm KPV heavy machine gun and 7.62 mm PKT coaxial light machine gun. The main gun is not stabilized (neither in the BTR-80 nor the BTR-80A), so accurate fire on the move is limited (to low speeds), and the rotation mechanism is manually operated. In some cases, it is fitted with a BPPU turret with a 30-mm 2A72 and a PKT. The gunner sits in a roof mounted chair located above the flat floor behind the driver/commander and two passengers, and before the passenger bench. The gunner's station is basic, but uncharacteristically spacious for a Soviet-designed armored vehicle. The gunner is equipped with daytime sight. There are six 902V "Tucha" 81 mm smoke grenade launchers mounted on the rear of the turret.

History
The distant ancestor of GAZ-3937 "Vodnik" is floating car under the symbol NAMI-0281, of which the design begun in 1985. Though, this car had a completely different layout. The compartment of the power unit was located in the rear of the vehicle and the cargo compartment was housed in the middle. This solution made it possible to maintain a trim while afloat, almost regardless of the load. The modern GAZ-3937 has retained almost nothing from its predecessor. NAMI-0281 itself has some resemblance to the BRDM.

Versions
Vodnik is available in two versions. 
 GAZ-3937 - the driver and passenger sit one behind the other on the left side of the vehicle and to their right is the power plant. 
 GAZ-39371 - nose pushed forward for the wheel arches. And the driving compartment seats three: a driver and a passenger - one after the other as before, and the second passenger - the right of the driver.

Operators

 
 
 
 A GAZ-3937 "Vodnik" was captured by Ukrainian armed forces during Russia's invasion of Ukraine. It was last seen operating with UAF in action near Bakhmut in February, 2023.

Specifications
 Vehicle Weight (total), kg: 6600-7500
 Payload, kg: 1500-2500
 Number of passengers: 6
 Length, mm: 5800
 Width, mm: 2600
 Height, mm: 2630
 Wheelbase, mm: 3000
 Track, mm: 2200
 Ground clearance, mm: 475
 Engine: GAZ-5621 6-cyl. 128.7 kW/175 hp turbodiesel
 Rab. volume, cm³: 3200
 Weight: 310 kg
 Speed: 120 km/h
 Cruising range, km: 700-1000

See also

 GAZ-2330 – civil original
 GAZ-2975 "Tigr" – military armour vehicle

References

External links

 Vodnik at official GAZ page (Russian)
 «Водник» Arzamas Machine Building Plant 
 «Водник» Автомаркете/AutoMarket article
 «Водник» Redstar by Vadim Kozhukhovskiy
 «Дизельный двигатель ГАЗ-56211» the official website of the Company "Nizhny Novgorod motors" Division "Powertrain" GAZ Group

Off-road vehicles
Military Industrial Company military vehicles
Military trucks
Military vehicles of Russia
Cars of Russia
Military vehicles introduced in the 2000s